Lâm Quang Nhật (born August 29, 1997 in Ho Chi Minh City, Vietnam) is a Vietnamese swimmer who won a gold medal at the 2013 Southeast Asian Games in 1500 m freestyle.  He currently holds Vietnamese records in swimming in 800m freestyle, 1500m freestyle, 4 × 100 m freestyle relay and 4 × 200 m freestyle relay.

References

Vietnamese male swimmers
Living people
Swimmers at the 2014 Asian Games
1997 births
Southeast Asian Games medalists in swimming
Southeast Asian Games gold medalists for Vietnam
Southeast Asian Games silver medalists for Vietnam
Competitors at the 2013 Southeast Asian Games
Competitors at the 2015 Southeast Asian Games
Competitors at the 2017 Southeast Asian Games
Asian Games competitors for Vietnam
20th-century Vietnamese people
21st-century Vietnamese people